The 2001 SWAC men's basketball tournament was held March 6–10, 2001, at Bill Harris Arena in Birmingham, Alabama.  defeated , 64–52 in the championship game. The Hornets received the conference's automatic bid to the 2001 NCAA tournament as No. 16 seed in the South Region.

Bracket and results

References

2000–01 Southwestern Athletic Conference men's basketball season
SWAC men's basketball tournament